Theodoros Foustanos (born 1903) was a Greek fencer. He competed in the individual foil and épée competitions at the 1924 Summer Olympics.

References

External links
 

1903 births
Year of death missing
Greek male foil fencers
Olympic fencers of Greece
Fencers at the 1924 Summer Olympics
Greek male épée fencers
20th-century Greek people